Nextreme (stylised in all caps) is the sixth EP by Japanese electronicore band Fear, and Loathing in Las Vegas. It was released on 13 July 2011 through VAP. The title Nextreme was formed from "next" and "extreme" (or "limit"), meaning that the band received the previous work and thrust their "next limit" into a mini album. The EP made its debut at number 8 on the Oricon chart with 12,126 copies in its first week sales. Nextreme won the CD Shop Awards for New Blood category in 2012. The song "Jump Around" was selected to appear in the video game Pro Evolution Soccer 2012 as the fourth track, and "Chase the Light!" was used as the opening theme for the second season of the anime Kaiji.

Track listing

Personnel

Fear, and Loathing in Las Vegas
 So – clean vocals, backing unclean vocals, programming
 Minami – unclean vocals, rapping, keyboards, programming
 Sxun – lead guitar, backing vocals
 Taiki – rhythm guitar
 Mashu – bass
 Tomonori – drums, percussion

Additional personnel
 Yasuhisa Kataoka – production, mixing
 Kimihiro Nakase – production, mixing
 Tuckey – mastering
 Kentaro Tanaka – A&R
 Kai Kuzuyama – management
 Takashi Watanabe – package coordination
 Keisuke Nishina – sales promotion
 Takehiro Kobayashi – web promotion
 Yutty – art direction, design
 Yuji Ono – photography

Charts

Certifications

Awards

References

External links
 

Fear, and Loathing in Las Vegas (band) albums
2011 EPs
Post-hardcore EPs
Metalcore EPs